Dennis Hopper (May 17, 1936May 29, 2010) was an American actor, director, writer, film editor, photographer and artist. He made his first television appearance in 1955, and appeared in two films featuring James Dean, Rebel Without a Cause (1955) and Giant (1956). Over the next ten years, Hopper appeared frequently on television in guest roles, and by the end of the 1960s had played supporting roles in several films.

He directed and starred in Easy Rider (1969), winning an award at the Cannes Film Festival and was nominated for an Academy Award for Best Writing (Original Screenplay) as co-writer. He had a featured role in Apocalypse Now (1979). He subsequently appeared in Rumble Fish (1983) and The Osterman Weekend (1983), and received critical recognition for his work in Blue Velvet and Hoosiers, with the latter film garnering him an Academy Award nomination for best Supporting Actor. He directed Colors (1988). Hopper starred in the 1990 Motion Picture Flashback which was inspired by the 1960s Love Movement. He also played the villains King Koopa in Super Mario Bros (1993), and Howard Payne in Speed (1994). A total of six films starring Dennis Hopper have been selected for preservation in the National Film Registry. Hopper died of prostate cancer on May 29, 2010, 12 days after his 74th birthday and two months after he received a star on the Hollywood Walk of Fame.

Filmography
Hopper's film career spanned 55 years and encompassed appearances in over 150 films. Of those films: Rebel Without a Cause, Giant, Cool Hand Luke, Easy Rider, Apocalypse Now, and Hoosiers have been selected for preservation in the National Film Registry.

As actor

 I denotes film preservation in the United States National Film Registry.

As director or writer

Television 
Early in his career, Hopper made multiple appearances on television series, beginning with a single appearance on the anthology series Cavalcade of America. Hopper continued guest starring on television throughout the 1950s and '60s. Late in his career, Hopper returned to television with a recurring role on 24, a one-time appearance on Las Vegas, and starring roles on E-Ring and Crash.

Video games

References
General

Specific

External links

Hopper, Dennis
Hopper, Dennis
Hopper, Dennis